Dmitry Marushchak (born 13 November 1980 in Tashkent) is a Russian freestyle skier who specializes in the aerials discipline. He competed at the 2006 Winter Olympics and 2010 Winter Olympics.

External links

1980 births
Living people
Russian male freestyle skiers
Freestyle skiers at the 2006 Winter Olympics
Freestyle skiers at the 2010 Winter Olympics
Olympic freestyle skiers of Russia
Sportspeople from Tashkent
21st-century Russian people